The Hampton Beach Casino Ballroom is a seasonal live music and comedy venue located on the boardwalk of Hampton Beach, New Hampshire, United States. The venue is open from April to November, and within those eight months schedules upwards of 70 shows.

In 2010, Pollstar ranked the Casino Ballroom #23 in the Top 100 Worldwide Club Venues.

History

The facility was opened on July 4, 1899, by Wallace D. Lovell, who owned the Exeter, Hampton and Amesbury Street Railway Company, with the hope of bringing more business and tourism into the Hampton Beach area. In 1927, with performers beginning to achieve national stardom through various media, the ballroom was added to adapt to the changing nature of entertainment. The new owners wanted a facility that could hold 5,000 people, and thus the Casino Ballroom was born. After the expansion, the Casino Ballroom boasted the largest dance floor in New England, and 20,000 people made use of the massive space on a weekly basis that hosted acts such as Bing Crosby and Duke Ellington.

The rise of rock and roll brought many more changes to the Casino Ballroom. The owners at the time sold the facility to a consortium of local businessmen interested in restoring it to its former glory. After renovating the facility and restoring many of its original features, the Ballroom reopened in the 1970s as Club Casino. Renovations, however, were not enough to draw promoters back to the venue. Seeing an opportunity, one of the new owners sought to book then-little-known names such as U2 and aging stars such as Ray Charles as a way of restoring the venue's reputation. His bet paid off, and following another renovation in the late '70s and early '80s, Club Casino began booking the likes of Jerry Seinfeld, Melissa Etheridge and Phish. So popular was the location, in fact, that it was able to fit 50 events into a three-month period, unheard of at the time for most music halls.

In the 1990s, the club started to develop a reputation for tough bouncers and strict rules against dancing. Again, changes were made to the Club Casino. In an attempt to regain some of its past glory, the name was changed back to the Hampton Beach Casino Ballroom, the facade of the building was redone, and the adjacent hotel demolished. The venue's season now extends from April to November, and it continues to bring in some of the top names in entertainment.

Notable events
On July 8, 1971, an additional 4,000 fans showed up to an already sold-out Jethro Tull concert with Yes on their first American tour as a supporting band. Ticketless fans started rioting and scaling the walls to climb in through the windows. Police and the National Guard were called in, and the incident resulted in the town of Hampton banning rock concerts for a number of years.

On August 9, 1995, the day Jerry Garcia died, his former Grateful Dead bandmate Bob Weir and his band RatDog took the stage to play a show at the Casino. Fans and media outlets descended on the Ballroom, filling the venue's parking lot to hold a candlelight vigil while listening to the band play inside.

Micky Ward, professional boxer of The Fighter fame, fought Emanuel Augustus here on July 13, 2001. It was later named the 2001 Fight of the Year.

The Casino Ballroom is the only venue in the world that has hosted three generations of the Nelson family: Ozzie & Harriet Nelson in the 1930s, Ricky Nelson in the 1960s and '70s, and Matthew & Gunnar Nelson in the 1990s.

Notable performers
The following are some of the artists who have performed at the Casino Ballroom:

Adam Lambert
Alice Cooper
America
The All-American Rejects
The B-52's
Bad Company
Barenaked Ladies
B.B. King
The Beach Boys
Bill Burr
Billy Idol
Bing Crosby
Black Sabbath
The Black Crowes
Blondie
Bloodline
Blue Öyster Cult
Bob Seger
Bob Weir & RatDog
Brad Paisley
Bret Michaels
Bryan Adams
Buddy Guy
Buddy Rich
Bush
Caroline's Spine
Carrot Top
Chelsea Handler
Chicago
Chickenfoot
Cinderella
Counting Crows
The Cranberries
Creed
Crosby, Stills, & Nash
The Cult
Cyndi Lauper
Dane Cook
Daughtry
Danzig
Dave Brubeck
Dave Chappelle
Dio
Dizzy Gillespie
The Doors
Dokken
The Doobie Brothers
Dropkick Murphys
Eddie Money
Electric Light Orchestra
Extreme
FireHouse
Gallagher
George Carlin
Goo Goo Dolls
Hall & Oates
Hanson
The Hooters
Hootie & the Blowfish
Huey Lewis and the News
INXS
Janis Joplin
Jay Leno
Jeff Dunham
Jerry Garcia Band
Jerry Lee Lewis
Jerry Seinfeld
Jethro Tull
Jewel
Jim Gaffigan
Jimi Hendrix
Joan Jett
Joan Rivers
Joe Cocker
Judas Priest
Kathy Griffin
KC and the Sunshine Band
Killswitch Engage
Kings of Leon
The Kinks
Korn
Larry the Cable Guy
Led Zeppelin
Lewis Black
Limp Bizkit
Little Feat
LL Cool J
Louis Armstrong
Louis C.K.
Loving Spoonful
Lynyrd Skynyrd
The Mamas & the Papas
Marilyn Manson
Megadeth
Melissa Etheridge
Michael Kiwanuka
The Monkees
The Motels
Motörhead
Nelson
Panic! at the Disco
Pat Benatar
Peter, Paul and Mary
Phish
The Pixies
Pop Evil
 The Pretty Reckless
The Ramones
Ray Charles
Ray LaMontagne
Robert Palmer
Roy Orbison
The Runaways
Sam Kinison
Scorpions
Simon & Garfunkel
Social Distortion
Staind
Stan Getz
State Radio
Static-X
The Stompers
The Strokes
Styx
The Supremes
Tears for Fears
Ted Nugent
Tesla
Thirty Seconds to Mars
Tina Turner
The Tragically Hip
Toto
U2
Umphrey's McGee
Vanilla Fudge
Violent Femmes
The Wailers
Weezer
The Who
Widespread Panic
Whoopi Goldberg
Yes
Ziggy Marley
38 Special

References

External links
Hampton Beach Casino Ballroom official website

Music venues in New Hampshire
Tourist attractions in Rockingham County, New Hampshire
Buildings and structures in Rockingham County, New Hampshire
Hampton, New Hampshire